Anthony S. Waters is an artist whose work has appeared in role-playing games.

Career
Anthony S. Waters is best known for his work on Magic: The Gathering. He worked at Wizards of the Coast from 1997-1999 as a conceptual designer, graphic designer, writer, and card illustrator. His Dungeons & Dragons work includes Sharn: City of Towers and the 3rd edition Monster Manual II.

References

External links
 Anthony S. Waters at the Magic wiki

American artists
Living people
Place of birth missing (living people)
Role-playing game artists
Year of birth missing (living people)